This is an incomplete list of castles and fortresses in Finland.

 
Castles
Castles
Finland